In mathematics, the determinant is a scalar value that is a function of the entries of a square matrix. It characterizes some properties of the matrix and the linear map represented by the matrix. In particular, the determinant is nonzero if and only if the matrix is invertible and the linear map represented by the matrix is an isomorphism. The determinant of a product of matrices is the product of their determinants (the preceding property is a corollary of this one).

The determinant of a  matrix is

and the determinant of a  matrix is

The determinant of a  matrix can be defined in several equivalent ways. The Laplace expansion expresses the determinant of a  matrix as a linear combination of determinants of  submatrices. Gaussian elimination express the determinant as the product of the diagonal entries of a diagonal matrix that is obtained by a succession of elementary row operations.

Determinants can also be defined by some of their properties: the determinant is the unique function defined on the  matrices that has the four following properties.

Determinants occur throughout mathematics. For example, a matrix is often used to represent the coefficients in a system of linear equations, and determinants can be used to solve these equations (Cramer's rule), although other methods of solution are computationally much more efficient. Determinants are used for defining the characteristic polynomial of a matrix, whose roots are the eigenvalues. In geometry, the signed -dimensional volume of a -dimensional parallelepiped is expressed by a determinant. This is used in calculus with exterior differential forms and the Jacobian determinant, in particular for changes of variables in multiple integrals.

2 × 2 matrices 
The determinant of a  matrix  is denoted either by "" or by vertical bars around the matrix, and is defined as

For example,

First properties 
The determinant has several key properties that can be proved by direct evaluation of the definition for -matrices, and that continue to hold for determinants of larger matrices. They are as follows: first, the determinant of the identity matrix  is 1.
Second, the determinant is zero if two rows are the same:

This holds similarly if the two columns are the same. Moreover,

Finally, if any column is multiplied by some number  (i.e., all entries in that column are multiplied by that number), the determinant is also multiplied by that number:

Geometric meaning

In either case, the images of the basis vectors form a parallelogram that represents the image of the unit square under the mapping.

The absolute value of the determinant together with the sign becomes the oriented area of the parallelogram. The oriented area is the same as the usual area, except that it is negative when the angle from the first to the second vector defining the parallelogram turns in a clockwise direction (which is opposite to the direction one would get for the identity matrix).

To show that  is the signed area, one may consider a matrix containing two vectors  and  representing the parallelogram's sides. Due to the sine this already is the signed area, yet it may be expressed more conveniently using the cosine of the complementary angle to a perpendicular vector, e.g. , so that , which can be determined by the pattern of the scalar product to be equal to :

 

Thus the determinant gives the scaling factor and the orientation induced by the mapping represented by A. When the determinant is equal to one, the linear mapping defined by the matrix is equi-areal and orientation-preserving.

The object known as the bivector is related to these ideas. The bivector magnitude (denoted by ) is the signed area, which is also the determinant .

If an  real matrix A is written in terms of its column vectors , then

This means that  maps the unit n-cube to the n-dimensional parallelotope defined by the vectors  the region 

The determinant gives the signed n-dimensional volume of this parallelotope,  and hence describes more generally the n-dimensional volume scaling factor of the linear transformation produced by A. (The sign shows whether the transformation preserves or reverses orientation.) In particular, if the determinant is zero, then this parallelotope has volume zero and is not fully n-dimensional, which indicates that the dimension of the image of A is less than n. This means that A produces a linear transformation which is neither onto nor one-to-one, and so is not invertible.

Definition 

Let A be a square matrix with n rows and n columns, so that it can be written as

The entries  etc. are, for many purposes, real or complex numbers. As discussed below, the determinant is also defined for matrices whose entries are in a commutative ring.

The determinant of A is denoted by det(A), or it can be denoted directly in terms of the matrix entries by writing enclosing bars instead of brackets:

There are various equivalent ways to define the determinant of a square matrix A, i.e. one with the same number of rows and columns: the determinant can be defined via the Leibniz formula, an explicit formula involving sums of products of certain entries of the matrix. The determinant can also be characterized as the unique function depending on the entries of the matrix satisfying certain properties. This approach can also be used to compute determinants by simplifying the matrices in question.

Leibniz formula

3 × 3 matrices 
The Leibniz formula for the determinant of a  matrix is the following:

The rule of Sarrus is a mnemonic for the expanded form of this determinant: the sum of the products of three diagonal north-west to south-east lines of matrix elements, minus the sum of the products of three diagonal south-west to north-east lines of elements, when the copies of the first two columns of the matrix are written beside it as in the illustration. This scheme for calculating the determinant of a  matrix does not carry over into higher dimensions.

n × n matrices 

In higher dimension, the Leibniz formula expresses the determinant of an -matrix as an expression involving permutations and their signatures. A permutation of the set  is a function  that reorders this set of integers. The set of all such permutations, called the symmetric group, is commonly denoted . The signature  of a permutation  is  if the permutation can be obtained with an even number of exchanges of two entries; otherwise, it is 

Given a matrix

the Leibniz formula for its determinant is, using sigma notation,

Using pi notation, this can be shortened into
.

With the Levi-Civita symbol, Leibniz formula may be written as 

where the sum is taken over all -tuples of integers in

Properties of the determinant

Characterization of the determinant
The determinant can be characterized by the following three key properties. To state these, it is convenient to regard an -matrix A as being composed of its  columns, so denoted as

where the column vector  (for each i) is composed of the entries of the matrix in the i-th column.

  , where  is an identity matrix.
  The determinant is multilinear: if the jth column of a matrix  is written as a linear combination  of two column vectors v and w and a number r, then the determinant of A is expressible as a similar linear combination:
 
 The determinant is alternating: whenever two columns of a matrix are identical, its determinant is 0:
 

If the determinant is defined using the Leibniz formula as above, these three properties can be proved by direct inspection of that formula. Some authors also approach the determinant directly using these three properties: it can be shown that there is exactly one function that assigns to any -matrix A a number that satisfies these three properties. This also shows that this more abstract approach to the determinant yields the same definition as the one using the Leibniz formula.

To see this it suffices to expand the determinant by multi-linearity in the columns into a (huge) linear combination of determinants of matrices in which each column is a standard basis vector. These determinants are either 0 (by property 9) or else ±1 (by properties 1 and 12 below), so the linear combination gives the expression above in terms of the Levi-Civita symbol. While less technical in appearance, this characterization cannot entirely replace the Leibniz formula in defining the determinant, since without it the existence of an appropriate function is not clear.

Immediate consequences
These rules have several further consequences:
 The determinant is a homogeneous function, i.e.,  (for an  matrix ).
 Interchanging any pair of columns of a matrix multiplies its determinant by −1. This follows from the determinant being multilinear and alternating (properties 2 and 3 above):  This formula can be applied iteratively when several columns are swapped. For example  Yet more generally, any permutation of the columns multiplies the determinant by the sign of the permutation.
 If some column can be expressed as a linear combination of the other columns (i.e. the columns of the matrix form a linearly dependent set), the determinant is 0. As a special case, this includes: if some column is such that all its entries are zero, then the determinant of that matrix is 0.
 Adding a scalar multiple of one column to another column does not change the value of the determinant. This is a consequence of multilinearity and being alternative: by multilinearity the determinant changes by a multiple of the determinant of a matrix with two equal columns, which determinant is 0, since the determinant is alternating.
 If  is a triangular matrix, i.e. , whenever  or, alternatively, whenever , then its determinant equals the product of the diagonal entries:  Indeed, such a matrix can be reduced, by appropriately adding multiples of the columns with fewer nonzero entries to those with more entries, to a diagonal matrix (without changing the determinant).  For such a matrix, using the linearity in each column reduces to the identity matrix, in which case the stated formula holds by the very first characterizing property of determinants. Alternatively, this formula can also be deduced from the Leibniz formula, since the only permutation  which gives a non-zero contribution is the identity permutation.

Example
These characterizing properties and their consequences listed above are both theoretically significant, but can also be used to compute determinants for concrete matrices. In fact, Gaussian elimination can be applied to bring any matrix into upper triangular form, and the steps in this algorithm affect the determinant in a controlled way. The following concrete example illustrates the computation of the determinant of the matrix  using that method:

Combining these equalities gives

Transpose
The determinant of the transpose of  equals the determinant of A:
.
This can be proven by inspecting the Leibniz formula. This implies that in all the properties mentioned above, the word "column" can be replaced by "row" throughout. For example, viewing an  matrix as being composed of n rows, the determinant is an n-linear function.

Multiplicativity and matrix groups 

Moreover, they both take the value  when  is the identity matrix. The above-mentioned unique characterization of alternating multilinear maps therefore shows this claim.

A matrix  is invertible precisely if its determinant is nonzero. In this event, the determinant of the inverse matrix is given by
.

In particular, products and inverses of matrices with non-zero determinant (respectively, determinant one) still have this property. Thus, the set of such matrices (of fixed size ) forms a group known as the general linear group  (respectively, a subgroup called the special linear group . More generally, the word "special" indicates the subgroup of another matrix group of matrices of determinant one. Examples include the special orthogonal group (which if n is 2 or 3 consists of all rotation matrices), and the special unitary group.

The Cauchy–Binet formula is a generalization of that product formula for rectangular matrices. This formula can also be recast as a multiplicative formula for compound matrices whose entries are the determinants of all quadratic submatrices of a given matrix.

Laplace expansion 
Laplace expansion expresses the determinant of a matrix  in terms of determinants of smaller matrices, known as its minors. The expression  is known as a cofactor. For every , one has the equality

which is called the Laplace expansion along the th row. For example, the Laplace expansion along the first row gives the following formula:

Unwinding the determinants of these -matrices gives back the Leibniz formula mentioned above. Similarly, the Laplace expansion along the -th column is the equality

Laplace expansion can be used iteratively for computing determinants, but this approach is inefficient for large matrices. However, it is useful for computing the determinants of highly symmetric matrix such as the Vandermonde matrix

This determinant has been applied, for example, in the proof of Baker's theorem in the theory of transcendental numbers.

Adjugate matrix
The adjugate matrix  is the transpose of the matrix of the cofactors, that is,
 

For every matrix, one has
 

Thus the adjugate matrix can be used for expressing the inverse of a nonsingular matrix:

Block matrices 
The easiest such formula, which can be proven using either the Leibniz formula or a factorization involving the Schur complement, is

If  is invertible (and similarly if  is invertible), one has

If the blocks are square matrices of the same size further formulas hold. For example, if  and  commute (i.e.), then there holds 

This formula has been generalized to matrices composed of more than  blocks, again under appropriate commutativity conditions among the individual blocks.

Sylvester's determinant theorem 
Sylvester's determinant theorem states that for A, an  matrix, and B, an  matrix (so that A and B have dimensions allowing them to be multiplied in either order forming a square matrix):

From this general result several consequences follow.

Sum

Sum identity for 2×2 matrices 

For the special case of  matrices with complex entries, the determinant of the sum can be written in terms of determinants and traces in the following identity:

This has an application to  matrix algebras. For example, consider the complex numbers as a matrix algebra. The complex numbers have a representation as matrices of the form

Properties of the determinant in relation to other notions

Eigenvalues and characteristic polynomial 

The determinant is closely related to two other central concepts in linear algebra, the eigenvalues and the characteristic polynomial of a matrix. Let  be an -matrix with complex entries with eigenvalues . (Here it is understood that an eigenvalue with algebraic multiplicity  occurs  times in this list.)

The product of all non-zero eigenvalues is referred to as pseudo-determinant.

The characteristic polynomial is defined as

By means of this polynomial, determinants can be used to find the eigenvalues of the matrix : they are precisely the roots of this polynomial, i.e., those complex numbers  such that

A Hermitian matrix is positive definite if all its eigenvalues are positive. Sylvester's criterion asserts that this is equivalent to the determinants of the submatrices

Trace 
Thus, for complex matrices ,

or, for real matrices ,

cf. Cayley-Hamilton theorem. Such expressions are deducible from combinatorial arguments, Newton's identities, or the Faddeev–LeVerrier algorithm. That is, for generic ,  the signed constant term of the characteristic polynomial, determined recursively from

In the general case, this may also be obtained from

where the sum is taken over the set of all integers  satisfying the equation

The formula can be expressed in terms of the complete exponential Bell polynomial of n arguments sl = −(l – 1)! tr(Al) as

The product and trace of such matrices are defined in a natural way as

An important arbitrary dimension  identity can be obtained from the Mercator series expansion of the logarithm when the expansion converges.  If every eigenvalue of A is less than 1 in absolute value,

where  is the identity matrix.  More generally, if

Upper and lower bounds 
For a positive definite matrix , the trace operator gives the following tight lower and upper bounds on the log determinant

with equality if and only if . This relationship can be derived via the formula for the Kullback-Leibler divergence between two multivariate normal distributions.

Also,

These inequalities can be proved by expressing the traces and the determinant in terms of the eigenvalues. As such, they represent the well-known fact that the harmonic mean is less than the geometric mean, which is less than the arithmetic mean, which is, in turn, less than the root mean square.

Derivative 
In particular, it is everywhere differentiable. Its derivative can be expressed using Jacobi's formula:

In particular, if  is invertible, we have

 

Yet another equivalent formulation is

,

using big O notation. The special case where , the identity matrix, yields

This identity is used in describing Lie algebras associated to certain matrix Lie groups. For example, the special linear group  is defined by the equation . The above formula shows that its Lie algebra is the special linear Lie algebra  consisting of those matrices having trace zero.

Writing a -matrix as  where  are column vectors of length 3, then the gradient over one of the three vectors may be written as the cross product of the other two:

History 
Historically, determinants were used long before matrices: A determinant was originally defined as a property of a system of linear equations.
The determinant "determines" whether the system has a unique solution (which occurs precisely if the determinant is non-zero).
In this sense, determinants were first used in the Chinese mathematics textbook The Nine Chapters on the Mathematical Art (九章算術, Chinese scholars, around the 3rd century BCE). In Europe, solutions of linear systems of two equations were expressed by Cardano in 1545 by a determinant-like entity.

Determinants proper originated from the work of Seki Takakazu in 1683 in Japan and parallelly of Leibniz in 1693.  stated, without proof, Cramer's rule. Both Cramer and also  were led to determinants by the question of plane curves passing through a given set of points.

Vandermonde (1771) first recognized determinants as independent functions.  gave the general method of expanding a determinant in terms of its complementary minors: Vandermonde had already given a special case. Immediately following, Lagrange (1773) treated determinants of the second and third order and applied it to questions of elimination theory; he proved many special cases of general identities.

Gauss (1801) made the next advance. Like Lagrange, he made much use of determinants in the theory of numbers. He introduced the word "determinant" (Laplace had used "resultant"), though not in the present signification, but rather as applied to the discriminant of a quantic. Gauss also arrived at the notion of reciprocal (inverse) determinants, and came very near the multiplication theorem.

The next contributor of importance is Binet (1811, 1812), who formally stated the theorem relating to the product of two matrices of m columns and n rows, which for the special case of  reduces to the multiplication theorem. On the same day (November 30, 1812) that Binet presented his paper to the Academy, Cauchy also presented one on the subject. (See Cauchy–Binet formula.) In this he used the word "determinant" in its present sense, summarized and simplified what was then known on the subject, improved the notation, and gave the multiplication theorem with a proof more satisfactory than Binet's. With him begins the theory in its generality.

 used the functional determinant which Sylvester later called the Jacobian. In his memoirs in Crelle's Journal for 1841 he specially treats this subject, as well as the class of alternating functions which Sylvester has called alternants. About the time of Jacobi's last memoirs, Sylvester (1839) and Cayley began their work.  introduced the modern notation for the determinant using vertical bars.

The study of special forms of determinants has been the natural result of the completion of the general theory. Axisymmetric determinants have been studied by Lebesgue, Hesse, and Sylvester; persymmetric determinants by Sylvester and Hankel; circulants by Catalan, Spottiswoode, Glaisher, and Scott; skew determinants and Pfaffians, in connection with the theory of orthogonal transformation, by Cayley; continuants by Sylvester; Wronskians (so called by Muir) by Christoffel and Frobenius; compound determinants by Sylvester, Reiss, and Picquet; Jacobians and Hessians by Sylvester; and symmetric gauche determinants by Trudi. Of the textbooks on the subject Spottiswoode's was the first. In America, Hanus (1886), Weld (1893), and Muir/Metzler (1933) published treatises.

Applications

Cramer's rule 

This equation has a unique solution  if and only if  is nonzero. In this case, the solution is given by Cramer's rule:

This follows immediately by column expansion of the determinant, i.e.

where the vectors  are the columns of A.  The rule is also implied by the identity

Cramer's rule can be implemented in  time, which is comparable to more common methods of solving systems of linear equations, such as LU, QR, or singular value decomposition.

Linear independence 
Determinants can be used to characterize linearly dependent vectors:  is zero if and only if the column vectors (or, equivalently, the row vectors) of the matrix  are linearly dependent. For example, given two linearly independent vectors , a third vector  lies in the plane spanned by the former two vectors exactly if the determinant of the -matrix consisting of the three vectors is zero. The same idea is also used in the theory of differential equations: given functions  (supposed to be  times differentiable), the Wronskian is defined to be

It is non-zero (for some ) in a specified interval if and only if the given functions and all their derivatives up to order  are linearly independent. If it can be shown that the Wronskian is zero everywhere on an interval then, in the case of analytic functions, this implies the given functions are linearly dependent. See the Wronskian and linear independence. Another such use of the determinant is the resultant, which gives a criterion when two polynomials have a common root.

Orientation of a basis 

The determinant can be thought of as assigning a number to every sequence of n vectors in Rn, by using the square matrix whose columns are the given vectors. For instance, an orthogonal matrix with entries in Rn represents an orthonormal basis in Euclidean space. The determinant of such a matrix determines whether the orientation of the basis is consistent with or opposite to the orientation of the standard basis. If the determinant is +1, the basis has the same orientation. If it is −1, the basis has the opposite orientation.

More generally, if the determinant of A is positive, A represents an orientation-preserving linear transformation (if A is an orthogonal  or  matrix, this is a rotation), while if it is negative, A switches the orientation of the basis.

Volume and Jacobian determinant 
As pointed out above, the absolute value of the determinant of real vectors is equal to the volume of the parallelepiped spanned by those vectors.

By calculating the volume of the tetrahedron bounded by four points, they can be used to identify skew lines.

For a general differentiable function, much of the above carries over by considering the Jacobian matrix of f. For

the Jacobian matrix is the  matrix whose entries are given by the partial derivatives

Its determinant, the Jacobian determinant, appears in the higher-dimensional version of integration by substitution: for suitable functions f and an open subset U of Rn (the domain of f), the integral over f(U) of some other function  is given by

The Jacobian also occurs in the inverse function theorem.

When applied to the field of Cartography, the determinant can be used to measure the rate of expansion of a map near the poles.

Abstract algebraic aspects

Determinant of an endomorphism 
The above identities concerning the determinant of products and inverses of matrices imply that similar matrices have the same determinant: two matrices A and B are similar, if there exists an invertible matrix X such that . Indeed, repeatedly applying the above identities yields

The determinant is therefore also called a similarity invariant. The determinant of a linear transformation

for some finite-dimensional vector space V is defined to be the determinant of the matrix describing it, with respect to an arbitrary choice of basis in V. By the similarity invariance, this determinant is independent of the choice of the basis for V and therefore only depends on the endomorphism T.

Square matrices over commutative rings 

The above definition of the determinant using the Leibniz rule holds works more generally when the entries of the matrix are elements of a commutative ring , such as the integers , as opposed to the field of real or complex numbers. Moreover, the characterization of the determinant as the unique alternating multilinear map that satisfies  still holds, as do all the properties that result from that characterization.

For , this means that the determinant is +1 or −1. Such a matrix is called unimodular.

The determinant being multiplicative, it defines a group homomorphism

Since it respects the multiplication in both groups, this map is a group homomorphism.

The determinant respects these maps, i.e., the identity

holds. In other words, the displayed commutative diagram commutes.

For example, the determinant of the complex conjugate of a complex matrix (which is also the determinant of its conjugate transpose) is the complex conjugate of its determinant, and for integer matrices: the reduction modulo  of the determinant of such a matrix is equal to the determinant of the matrix reduced modulo  (the latter determinant being computed using modular arithmetic). Adding yet another layer of abstraction, this is captured by saying that the determinant is a morphism of algebraic groups, from the general linear group to the multiplicative group,

Exterior algebra 

The map  induces a linear map

Some authors such as  use this fact to define the determinant to be the element in  satisfying the following identity (for all ):

This definition agrees with the more concrete coordinate-dependent definition.

Generalizations and related notions 

Determinants as treated above admit several variants: the permanent of a matrix is defined as the determinant, except that the factors  occurring in Leibniz's rule are omitted. The immanant generalizes both by introducing a character of the symmetric group  in Leibniz's rule.

Determinants for finite-dimensional algebras
For any associative algebra  that is finite-dimensional as a vector space over a field , there is a determinant map

This definition proceeds by establishing the characteristic polynomial independently of the determinant, and defining the determinant as the lowest order term of this polynomial. This general definition recovers the determinant for the matrix algebra , but also includes several further cases including the determinant of a quaternion,
,
the norm  of a field extension, as well as the Pfaffian of a skew-symmetric matrix and the reduced norm of a central simple algebra, also arise as special cases of this construction.

Infinite matrices 
For matrices with an infinite number of rows and columns, the above definitions of the determinant do not carry over directly. For example, in the Leibniz formula, an infinite sum (all of whose terms are infinite products) would have to be calculated. Functional analysis provides different extensions of the determinant for such infinite-dimensional situations, which however only work for particular kinds of operators.

The Fredholm determinant defines the determinant for operators known as trace class operators by an appropriate generalization of the formula

Another infinite-dimensional notion of determinant is the functional determinant.

Operators in von Neumann algebras
For operators in a finite factor, one may define a positive real-valued determinant called the Fuglede−Kadison determinant using the canonical trace. In fact, corresponding to every tracial state on a von Neumann algebra there is a notion of Fuglede−Kadison determinant.

Related notions for non-commutative rings 

For square matrices with entries in a non-commutative ring, there are various difficulties in defining determinants analogously to that for commutative rings. A meaning can be given to the Leibniz formula provided that the order for the product is specified, and similarly for other definitions of the determinant, but non-commutativity then leads to the loss of many fundamental properties of the determinant, such as the multiplicative property or that the determinant is unchanged under transposition of the matrix. Over non-commutative rings, there is no reasonable notion of a multilinear form (existence of a nonzero  with a regular element of R as value on some pair of arguments implies that R is commutative). Nevertheless, various notions of non-commutative determinant have been formulated that preserve some of the properties of determinants, notably quasideterminants and the Dieudonné determinant. For some classes of matrices with non-commutative elements, one can define the determinant and prove linear algebra theorems that are very similar to their commutative analogs. Examples include the q-determinant on quantum groups, the Capelli determinant on Capelli matrices, and the Berezinian on supermatrices (i.e., matrices whose entries are elements of -graded rings). Manin matrices form the class closest to matrices with commutative elements.

Calculation 
Determinants are mainly used as a theoretical tool. They are rarely calculated explicitly in numerical linear algebra, where for applications such as checking invertibility and finding eigenvalues the determinant has largely been supplanted by other techniques. Computational geometry, however, does frequently use calculations related to determinants.

While the determinant can be computed directly using the Leibniz rule this approach is extremely inefficient for large matrices, since that formula requires calculating  ( factorial) products for an -matrix. Thus, the number of required operations grows very quickly: it is of order . The Laplace expansion is similarly inefficient. Therefore, more involved techniques have been developed for calculating determinants.

Decomposition methods 
Some methods compute  by writing the matrix as a product of matrices whose determinants can be more easily computed. Such techniques are referred to as decomposition methods. Examples include the LU decomposition, the QR decomposition or the Cholesky decomposition (for positive definite matrices).

For example, LU decomposition expresses  as a product

of a permutation matrix  (which has exactly a single  in each column, and otherwise zeros), a lower triangular matrix  and an upper triangular matrix .
The determinants of the two triangular matrices  and  can be quickly calculated, since they are the products of the respective diagonal entries.

Further methods 
The order  reached by decomposition methods has been improved by different methods. This means, for example, that an  algorithm for computing the determinant exists based on the Coppersmith–Winograd algorithm. This exponent has been further lowered, as of 2016, to 2.373.

In addition to the complexity of the algorithm, further criteria can be used to compare algorithms.
Especially for applications concerning matrices over rings, algorithms that compute the determinant without any divisions exist. (By contrast, Gauss elimination requires divisions.) One such algorithm, having complexity  is based on the following idea: one replaces permutations (as in the Leibniz rule) by so-called closed ordered walks, in which several items can be repeated. The resulting sum has more terms than in the Leibniz rule, but in the process several of these products can be reused, making it more efficient than naively computing with the Leibniz rule. Algorithms can also be assessed according to their bit complexity, i.e., how many bits of accuracy are needed to store intermediate values occurring in the computation. For example, the Gaussian elimination (or LU decomposition) method is of order , but the bit length of intermediate values can become exponentially long. By comparison, the Bareiss Algorithm, is an exact-division method (so it does use division, but only in cases where these divisions can be performed without remainder) is of the same order, but the bit complexity is roughly the bit size of the original entries in the matrix times .

Charles Dodgson (i.e. Lewis Carroll of Alice's Adventures in Wonderland fame) invented a method for computing determinants called Dodgson condensation.  Unfortunately this interesting method does not always work in its original form.

See also 

 Cauchy determinant
 Cayley–Menger determinant
 Dieudonné determinant
 Slater determinant
 Determinantal conjecture

Notes

References 

 
 
 
 
 
 
 
 
 
 
 
 
 
 
 
 
 
 
 
 G. Baley Price (1947) "Some identities in the theory of determinants", American Mathematical Monthly 54:75–90

Historical references

External links 

 
 
 
 Determinant Interactive Program and Tutorial
 Linear algebra: determinants.  Compute determinants of matrices up to order 6 using Laplace expansion you choose.
 Determinant Calculator Calculator for matrix determinants, up to the 8th order.
 Matrices and Linear Algebra on the Earliest Uses Pages
 Determinants explained in an easy fashion in the 4th chapter as a part of a Linear Algebra course.

 
Matrix theory
Linear algebra
Homogeneous polynomials
Algebra